Jabal Moussa Biosphere Reserve is a nature reserve located in the Keserwan District of Lebanon, on the shoulders of the western slopes of Mount Lebanon overlooking the Mediterranean Sea to the West. It covers an area of 6500 hectares, at an altitude ranging between 350 meters in the North-West and 1,700 meters to the South-East. Its main villages are: Yahchouch, Qehmez, Jouret el-Termos, Nahr ed Dahab, Ghbaleh, Ebreh, and Chouwan. Jabal Moussa and surrounding villages became part of the UNESCO Network of Biosphere Reserves under the Man and Biosphere (MAB) program in 2009. As part of the MAB program, JMBR addresses human livelihood improvement and nature conservation through combining natural sciences with social sciences, economics and education. 

The Jabal Moussa mountain presents an exceptionally rich biodiversity, with more than 724 flora species, 25 mammal species, and more than 137 migratory and soaring birds species. In 2009, Jabal Moussa was designated a Globally Important Bird Area. Equally rich with cultural heritage, it portrays the interdependence of Man and Nature throughout history through various spiritual and historical sites dating back from the Phoenician, Roman, and Ottoman Periods.

Climate 
Under the Köppen climate classification, the reserve has a Mediterranean climate (Csa/Csb depending on the altitude), with mostly dry and warm summers and cool to cold, wet winters. The region's average annual rainfall is about 1350mm. The peaks of the Jabal Moussa mountain receive some snowfall during winter, however the snowfall melts after a few days.

See also
 Al Shouf Cedar Nature Reserve
 Horsh Ehden
 Aammiq Wetland
World Network of Biosphere Reserves in the Arab States

References

Biosphere reserves of Lebanon
Important Bird Areas of Lebanon
Forests of Lebanon
Tourist attractions in Lebanon
Keserwan District